North Mission Road is a documentary-style show that details "unique and compelling" cases of the Los Angeles County Coroner Department. It was first aired on truTV, and now airs in reruns on the Justice Network. The name of the show is based on the road on which the office of the Los Angeles County Coroner is located.

References

External links 
 

2000s American documentary television series
2000s American crime television series
TruTV original programming
Law enforcement in California